Anastasia Popova may refer to:

Anastasia Popova (journalist)
Anastasia Popova (footballer)